In U.S. political jargon, a civilian personal assistant who accompanies the president of the United States virtually everywhere is referred to as a body man or body woman. These personal aides to the president are often responsible for arranging and providing lodging, transportation, interactions with media, public, and family, meals, personal briefings and briefing papers, logistical instructions, speech cards, snacks, cell phones, and any other necessary assistance. Such personal aides exist for many politicians aside from presidents, but the most famous have included personal aides to the president, as described below.

List of body men/women

President Richard Nixon
 Stephen Bull

President Gerald Ford
 Terrence O’Donnell
 Gregory Willard

President Jimmy Carter
 Timothy Kraft
 Phil Wise

President Ronald Reagan
 David Fischer
 Jim Kuhn

President George H. W. Bush
 Timothy McBride
 Michal Dannenhauer
 David Bates
 Tom Frechette

President Bill Clinton
 Douglas Band
 Kris Engskov

President George W. Bush
Logan Walters
Blake Gottesman
 Jared Weinstein
 Freddy Ford

President Barack Obama
 Reggie Love
 Marvin Nicholson

President Donald Trump
 John McEntee
 Jordan Karem
 Nick Luna

President Joe Biden
 Stephen Goepfert
 Jacob Spreyer

See also
 Aide-de-camp, a military assistant to a senior official
 White House social aide
 White House Military Office
 Road manager, performing similar duties for an entertainer or celebrity

References

Lists of American politicians